Taylor-Utley House is a historic home located at Fayetteville, Cumberland County, North Carolina. It was built about 1848, and is a -story, three bay, gable roofed frame dwelling in a vernacular Greek Revival style. It has a two-story wing added in 1932.

It was listed on the National Register of Historic Places in 1983.

References

Houses on the National Register of Historic Places in North Carolina
Greek Revival houses in North Carolina
Houses completed in 1848
Houses in Fayetteville, North Carolina
National Register of Historic Places in Cumberland County, North Carolina